Baby Tonight is the debut solo album by Marlon Jackson, released on July 13, 1987 by Capitol Records. It peaked at No. 22 on the Top R&B Albums chart in the United States. It was supported by the singles "Baby Tonight" and "Don't Go". As of 2022, Marlon has yet to make another solo studio album.

Track listing

Personnel
Marlon Jackson - vocals, keyboards, backing vocals
Paul Jackson, Jr. - guitar on "Don't Go"
Louis Johnson - bass
Greg Phillinganes, John Barnes, Khris Kellow, Fred Maher, Winston Johnson - keyboards
Fred Maher, Winston Johnson - drums
The Grit Brothers, Sweet Lips - horns
Gerald Albright - saxophone on "Don't Go"
Carol Jackson - female voice
Brittny Jackson, Valencia Jackson, Vesta Williams - backing vocals
Technical
Wayne Edwards - executive producer
Bill Bottrell, Fred Maher, Marlon Jackson, Paul Ericksen, Winston Johnson - engineers
Andy Wallace, Bill Bottrell - mixing
Aaron Rapoport - photography

Charts

Weekly charts

Year-end charts

References

External links
Baby Tonight released by Marlon Jackson in 1987

Marlon Jackson albums
1987 debut albums
albums produced by Fred Maher
Capitol Records albums